Steven Owen O'Hara (born 17 July 1980) is a Scottish professional golfer.

O'Hara was born in Bellshill, and started playing golf at 7 years of age at Calderbraes Golf Club before moving to Colville Park GC. He had a successful amateur career which included winning the Scottish Amateur in 2000 and the St Andrews Links Trophy in 2001. He turned professional in 2001 after being part of the Scottish team winning the 2001 European Amateur Team Championship and a member of the first Great Britain and Ireland team to retain the Walker Cup, alongside future stars such as Luke Donald and Graeme McDowell.

After earning his card at qualifying school at the end of 2003, he competed on the European Tour, except for 2008 when he dropped down to the second tier Challenge Tour. O'Hara failed to regain his full playing rights on the European Tour for 2013 and failed to qualify for the final stages of Q-School.

O'Hara's younger brother Paul (born 1986) is also a professional golfer.

Amateur wins
1998 Boys Amateur Championship, Scottish Boys Championship
2000 Scottish Amateur Championship
2001 St Andrews Links Trophy

Results in major championships

Note: O'Hara only played in The Open Championship.
CUT = missed the half-way cut

Team appearances
Amateur
Jacques Léglise Trophy (representing Great Britain & Ireland): 1998 (winners)
European Youths' Team Championship (representing Scotland): 2000
Eisenhower Trophy (representing Great Britain & Ireland): 2000
St Andrews Trophy (representing Great Britain & Ireland): 2000 (winners)
European Amateur Team Championship (representing Scotland): 2001 (winners)
Walker Cup (representing Great Britain & Ireland): 2001 (winners)

See also
2008 Challenge Tour graduates
2009 European Tour Qualifying School graduates
2011 European Tour Qualifying School graduates

References

External links

Scottish male golfers
European Tour golfers
Sportspeople from Bellshill
Sportspeople from Motherwell
1980 births
Living people